Yana Ulla (Quechua yana black, Jaqaru ulla grilled potato, "black grilled potato", also spelled Yanaaulla, Yanaulla) is a mountain in the Andes of Peru, about  high. It is located in the Junín Region, Yauli Province, Marcapomacocha District, and in the Lima Region, Huarochirí Province, Carampoma District. Yana Ulla lies southwest of Quriqucha and northwest of Qunchupata. A lake named Yana Ulla is at the feet of the mountains.

References

Mountains of Peru
Mountains of Lima Region
Mountains of Junín Region